Edward Lewis Ferman (born March 6, 1937) is an American science fiction and fantasy editor and magazine publisher, known best as the editor of The Magazine of Fantasy and Science Fiction (F&SF).

Ferman is the son of Joseph W. Ferman, the publisher and sometime editor who established F&SF in 1949. He took over as editor in 1964 when Avram Davidson could no longer practically continue, as a resident of Latin American locales with unreliable postal delivery. (Joseph Ferman was listed as editor during 1964–65, however, followed by Edward from January 1966 through June 1991.) Edward Ferman would take on the role of publisher, as well, by 1970, as his father gradually retired. He continued as editor until 1991, when he hired his replacement, Kristine Kathryn Rusch, and continued as publisher of F&SF until he sold it to Gordon Van Gelder in 2000.  During Ferman's tenure, many other speculative fiction magazines struggled or went out of business. His magazine, along with Analog, continued to maintain a regular schedule and to receive critical appreciation for its contents.

During 1969 and 1970, Ferman was also the editor of F&SF's sister publication Venture Science Fiction Magazine. Together, the Fermans had also edited and published the short-lived nostalgia and humor magazine P.S. and a similarly brief run of a magazine about mysticism and other proto-New Age matters, Inner Space.

Ferman won the Hugo Award for Best Professional Editor three years in a row, from 1981 through 1983. F&SF had previously won four Hugos as the best professional magazine under his editorship. At least in the last decade of his tenure, he worked from a table in the family's Connecticut house.  He edited or co-edited several volumes of stories from F&SF and co-edited Final Stage with Barry N. Malzberg.  It is probable that he also ghost-edited No Limits for or with Joseph Ferman, an anthology drawn from the pages of the first run of Venture.

Ferman was recognized by a special World Fantasy Award for professional work in 1979 and by the World Fantasy Award for Life Achievement in 1998. He was inducted by the Science Fiction Hall of Fame in 2009.

 Oi, Robot: competitions and cartoons from The Magazine of Fantasy & Science Fiction (Mercury Press, 1995), edited by Ferman

See also

References

External links 
 
 
 

1937 births
American magazine publishers (people)
American speculative fiction editors
American speculative fiction publishers (people)
Hugo Award-winning editors
The Magazine of Fantasy & Science Fiction people
Science fiction editors
Science Fiction Hall of Fame inductees
American people of Lithuanian descent
Living people
Male speculative fiction editors